Oberinspektor Marek is an Austrian television series.

See also
List of Austrian television series

External links
 

ORF (broadcaster)
Austrian crime television series
1963 Austrian television series debuts
1970 Austrian television series endings
1960s Austrian television series
1970s Austrian television series
German-language television shows